With a Little Help from My Fwends is the second main album of the "Fwends" series by American rock band the Flaming Lips. It is a track-for-track tribute to the Beatles album Sgt. Pepper's Lonely Hearts Club Band, with guest performers appearing on each song. It was released on October 27, 2014, through Warner Bros. Records. All proceeds from record sales went to the Bella Foundation, an organization in Oklahoma City that helps provide veterinary care to pet owners in need.

Track listing

Charts

References

2014 albums
The Beatles tribute albums
The Flaming Lips albums
Warner Records albums
Charity albums